Karakaj (Serbian Cyrillic: Каракај) is a town located  north of the city Zvornik in Republika Srpska, Bosnia and Herzegovina on the Drina River. It also has aborder checkpoint with Serbia.

See also
 Zvornik

External links and references

Hans Fredrik Lehne, Chronology of Events in the Area of Zvornik 
Immigration and Refugee Board of Canada, Chronology of Events: September 1991 - July 1992, 1 July 1992. Online. UNHCR Refworld 
The International Criminal Tribunal for the former Yugoslavia (Case no. IT-00-40-I)
The International Criminal Tribunal for the former Yugoslavia (map of Bosnian cases)
The Humanitarian Law Center
Haverford College

Zvornik